Liudmila Vladimirovna Dmitrieva (born May 2, 1989) is a Russian sailor. She and Alisa Kirilyuk placed 13th in the women's 470 event at the 2016 Summer Olympics.

References

1989 births
Living people
Russian female sailors (sport)
Olympic sailors of Russia
Sailors at the 2016 Summer Olympics – 470
Universiade medalists in sailing
Universiade gold medalists for Russia